Samantha "Sammy" Howarth (born Samantha Hayward; 1 February 1971) is an English international footballer. She played in the FA Women's Premier League National Division with Liverpool, Doncaster Belles and Tranmere Rovers. As of 2013, she currently plays for Southampton Women's F.C.

Football career

Club
Howarth played in the 1993–94 Women's FA Cup final for Knowsley United against Doncaster Belles. Eight years later she was an unused substitute for Doncaster Belles as they lost the 2002 final to Fulham.

International
In June 1991 Howarth won the first of five England caps in a friendly draw against Denmark in Nordby.

References

External links
Howarth profile at Andover New Street Ladies FC website

1971 births
Living people
England women's international footballers
Doncaster Rovers Belles L.F.C. players
FA Women's National League players
Liverpool F.C. Women players
Southampton Saints L.F.C. players
Tranmere Rovers L.F.C. players
English women's footballers
Women's association football defenders
Women's association football midfielders